The Orlando Phantoms is a amateur outdoor football team in the state of Florida. Founded in 2010 they are a member of the APDFL (Amateur to Professional Developmental Football League).

They are 7-Time National Bowl Champions and 3-Time League Champions.

National Bowl Championships Won 
2012, Orlando Phantoms (FL) 7 vs Lowell Nor'easter (MA) 0
2014, Orlando Phantoms (FL) 17 vs Richmond County Golden Bears (NC) 8
2015, Orlando Phantoms (FL) 17 vs Michigan Stealth (MI) 6
2016, Orlando Phantoms (FL) 28 vs Catawba Hornets (NC) 24
2017, Orlando Phantoms (FL) 30 vs Rutherford Co. Raiders (NC) 22
2018, Orlando Phantoms (FL) 19 vs Virginia Chargers (VA) 0
2020, Orlando Phantoms (FL) 18 vs Kentucky Spartans (KY) 12

References

External links 
http://www.orlandophantoms.com/
https://www.theapdfl.net/
http://www.nationalfootballevents.com/ 

American football in Orlando, Florida